Bwe, also known as Bwe Karen and Bghai (Baghi), is a Karen language of Burma.

Distribution
Kayin State: Thandaung township (about 100 villages)
Kayah State: Hpruso township
Bago Region: Taungoo and Hpa-An townships

Dialects
Dialects are Western Bwe Karen and Eastern Bwe Karen. Most comprehend the Western Bwe Karen dialect.

References

External links
Bwe Karen basic lexicon at the Global Lexicostatistical Database

Karenic languages